Bayrisch Kraut (Bavarian cabbage) is a traditional Bavarian dish. It is made of shredded cabbage cooked in beef stock with pork lard, onion, apples, and seasoned with vinegar. It is typically served with bratwurst or roast pork. In German cuisine it is an alternative to sauerkraut.

See also

Bavarian cuisine
Brenntar

Further reading 
 Josef Thaller: Original Bayrisch, The Best of Bavarian Food. Hädecke, 2013, 
 Erhard Gorys: Das neue Küchenlexikon. dtv, München 1994–2002,

References 

Bavarian cuisine
Cabbage dishes
Wikipedia articles with style issues from April 2020